Much The Same is a punk rock band from the suburbs of Chicago, Illinois, United States.  Their style is based on the fast, melodic skate punk of the mid-to-late 1990s made popular by bands such as NOFX, Lagwagon, and No Use for a Name.

The band began in 1999 under the name Don't Look Down and changed to Much The Same in 2001 after a legal dispute with the now-defunct New Jersey band Don't Look Down.  They released Quitters Never Win on A-F Records in 2003 and Survive in 2006.

The band announced their break-up on April 23, 2007 following their first and only European tour.

They reunited for a final farewell performance on March 26, 2011 at Reggie's Rock Club in Chicago. The sold-out show featured both fan favorite songs and a few the band rarely, if ever, played live.

The band announced on March 30, 2015 that they reunited and would be working on a new album.

History

Lead singer and guitarist Chris "Gunner" McGrath and bassist Andy Simon started playing songs together with various people and bands beginning in 1997.  When McGrath decided to put out a local punk rock compilation entitled Fun With Dirt, he recruited SKG's drummer, Mike "Mook" Snoreck, to learn and record the song, and he joined immediately afterward.  This marked the official beginning of the band's career.

Soon afterward, Simon left to play guitar in SKG, and their bassist Adam Mufich took his place.  This lineup went on to play their first appearance on the Vans Warped Tour in Chicago in 2000.  Andy Simon later rejoined as a second guitarist in September 2000, only to leave again along with Mufich six months later, but not before recording the band's first CD, the Caught Off Guard EP.  Franky Tsoukalas and Matt Haraburda replaced them before the EP was released and their picture appears in the booklet despite the fact that they did not record the songs.

In 2001, it was at this point that the band decided they needed to change their name, leading to a rushed search for a new name commenced, producing largely unsatisfactory results.  In frustration, McGrath started searching through a thesaurus for any word or phrase that stood out, and "much the same" stuck out due to its appearance in the lyrics of his side band's song "Big Surprise."  The band decided the name was fitting, since it described the change of name as being irrelevant to the music of the band, and also served as self-deprecation acknowledging their similarity to many other popular punk bands of the time. Furthermore, at this point the incestuous emigration continued as Matt left to join Andy Simon's new band and SKG's singer/guitarist Dan O'Gorman was invited to join Much The Same.

In December 2001, the new lineup recorded a 3-song demo which eventually got the band signed to Anti-Flag's label A-F Records, where they released their first full-length album, Quitters Never Win in 2003. During a later tour with A Wilhelm Scream and Break the Silence, Snoreck decided he was no longer interested in the touring life and left the band to pursue his new clothing company, Offset Clothing.  The band found Jevin Kaye after his St. Louis, Missouri band Form Follows Failure had broken up, and invited him to join.  This lineup recorded the Nitro Records release Survive. In April 2007, after the band's European tour, McGrath left the band for personal reasons, with guitarist Dan O'Gorman leaving soon after, prompting the official break-up of the band.

The band announced on March 30, 2015 that they reunited with former Break the Silence drummer, Mike Ford, on drums.  In April, 2017, the band announced that Jevin had returned as the full-time drummer and would accompany them on their first South American tour later that year. In August, 2017, the band stated that Dan has been diagnosed with Stage 3 Cancer and will not be joining the band on their South American Tour, they have also stated that John Feliciano, formerly of Hit The Switch and One Last Chance, will be filling in for Dan. On 10 January they released the Song "Making Friends" (original by Lagwagon) digital. On June 7, 2019, the band unveiled the first single from their new album Everything Is Fine titled "Snake In The Grass".

On November 28, 2021, Much the Same announced that Feliciano was joining the band as a permanent member, making the band a five piece for the first time of its existence.

Members

Current line-up
Chris "Gunner" McGrath - vocals, guitar (1999-2007, 2011, 2015–present)
Franky Tsoukalas - bass, vocals (2001-2007, 2011, 2015–present)
Dan O'Gorman - guitar, vocals (2001-2007, 2011, 2015–present)
Jevin Kaye - drums (2003-2007, 2011, 2017–present)
John Feliciano - guitar (2021–present)

Past members
Mike Ford - drums (2015-2017)
Mike "Mook" Snoreck - drums (1999-2003)
Andy Simon - bass (1999), guitar, vocals (2000-2001)
Adam Mufich - bass, vocals (1999-2001)
Matt Haraburda - guitar (2001)

Timeline

Discography

Studio albums

Caught Off Guard EP (2001, Tank Records)
Quitters Never Win (2003, A-F Records)
Survive (2006, Nitro Records)
 Everything Is Fine (2019, Lockjaw Records, Thousand Islands Records, Pee Records)

Compilations
 Fun With Dirt: The Greatest Bands You've Never Heard (1999, Fun With Dirt Records)
 "Father & Son" (Original Version)
 Fun With Dirt 2: Songs You'll Like If You Have Good Taste (2000, Fun With Dirt Records)
 "Sample"
 2 Sugar Sampler Vol. 2 (2002, Jumpstart Records)
 "Quitters Never Win" (Demo version)
 "One of a Kind" (Demo version)
 I Killed Punk Rock (2006, Bouncing Betty Records)
 "The Greatest Betrayal" (Demo Version)
 HAIR: Chicago Punk Cuts (2006, Thick Records)
 "The Greatest Betrayal" (Alternate demo version)

Trivia

 In their song "Wish," they use a quote from the film Boondock Saints.
 In their song "Moto," they use a quote from the film That Thing You Do!.
 Though having nothing to do with the movie, the title of "Miss the Pain" was inspired by a line in the movie Swingers.
 On the Japanese import of their album Survive there is a bonus track entitled "Seasons Change" featuring guest vocals and guitar by Nick Diener, lead singer of The Swellers.

References

External links
Much The Same official site
Much The Same on Myspace.com
Much The Same on PureVolume.com
Much The Same on Interpunk.com
Much The Same on NitroRecords.com
Much The Same on PunkNews.org
Much The Same on Absolutepunk.net

Musical groups established in 1999
Musical groups disestablished in 2007
Musical groups from Chicago
Pop punk groups from Illinois
A-F Records artists
Skate punk groups
1999 establishments in Illinois